Kohama (小浜, 小濵 or 粉浜) may refer to:
Kohamajima, an island which is part of the town of Taketomi, Okinawa, Japan
Kohama-gobo, one of the names of Gosho-ji, a Buddhist temple in Takarazuka, Hyōgo Prefecture, Japan
Kohama style, a school of sake making in the former Settsu Province of Japan

People
Hidehiro Kohama (小浜英博 or 小濵 英博), a popular news and sports announcer on Sun Television in Japan
Mototaka Kohama (小浜元孝) (1932-2017), a Japanese basketball player and head coach who took his team to the world championships three times
Satoru Kohama, a Lt. Commander and CO of the Japanese destroyer Hatsushimo (1933) during World War II
Unabara Ohama Kohama (海原お浜・小浜), a Japanese manzai duo which had a TV variety show in the early 1970s

Transportation
Higashi-Kohama Station, a station on the Hankai Line in Osaka and Sakai, Osaka Prefecture, Japan
Kohama Station, a station on the Nankai Main Line in Nishinari-ku, Osaka
Toda-Kohama Station (戸田小浜駅), a station on the JR West Sanin Main Line in Toda, Masuda, Shimane Prefecture, Japan

See also
Obama (disambiguation) and Ohama (disambiguation) for the word written in Japanese with the same kanji 小浜, but pronounced Obama or Ohama

Japanese-language surnames